OCL Industrial Township is an industrial township in Rajgangpur, Sundargarh district in the Indian state of Odisha. It is home to a plant owned by OCL India, Ltd., formerly Odisha Cement, Ltd.

Demographics
 India census, OCL Industrial Township had a population of 2197. Males constitute 54% of the population and females 46%. OCL Industrial Township has an average literacy rate of 89%, higher than the national average of 59.5%: male literacy is 90%, and female literacy is 87%. In OCL Industrial Township, 8% of the population is under 6 years of age.

References

Cities and towns in Sundergarh district
Townships in India